Silarestan-e Olya Dam Ludab (also Romanized as Sīlārestān-e ‘Olyā Dam Lūdāb; also known as Sīlārestān, Sīlārestān-e Bālā, and Sīlārestān-e ‘Olyā) is a village in Ludab Rural District, Ludab District, Boyer-Ahmad County, Kohgiluyeh and Boyer-Ahmad Province, Iran. At the 2006 census, its population was 63, in 10 families.

References 

Populated places in Boyer-Ahmad County